Johann Friedrich Ludwig (19 March 1673 in Baden-Wurttemberg - 18 January 1752 in Lisbon), known in Portugal as João Frederico Ludovice, was a German-born Portuguese architect and goldsmith.

From Hohnehart to Rome
Ludovice was born in 1670 in Hohenhart, near Schwäbisch Hall, Germany. His parents are recorded as Peter Ludwig (a small government servant) and Elizabeth Ludwig, both Lutherans.

He first trained to be a goldsmith with his father, but joined the imperial army at age 19, during the Nine Years' War. After the Peace of Ryswick, in 1697, he goes to Rome, Italy. There, he works for the Jesuits, in particular in the Jesuit Andrea Pozzo's plan to decorate the altars of the Church of Saint Ignatius of Jesus. As part of this project, he reportedly worked in casting the silver figure designed by Pierre Le Gros, as well as bronze reliefs by Angelo de Rossi. Still in Rome, he converts to Catholicism, marries his wife, Clara Agnese (in 1700), and changes his name to Ludovice. As a result of his work, the Jesuits invite Ludovice to work in Portugal.

From Rome to Portugal
In the 10th of September, 1701, Ludovice signs a contract, as a goldsmith, with the Jesuits of Lisbon, Portugal. In this contract, he is to work exclusively for them for seven years, making silver and metal work for their buildings, with an annual pay of 500 escudos. In 1701, his eldest son, João Pedro, is born, already in Portuguese soil.

In 1711, ten years after arriving in Lisbon, Ludovice is commissioned the project for the Mafra National Palace (1717–1731) for the Portuguese king João V. It is not known exactly why Ludovice was commissioned the project, but a combination of factors have been suggested, ranging from lack of capable native and foreign architects in Portugal at the time, the recommendation of the Roman Jesuists, and the probably patronage of Queen Maria Anna of Austria (who may have enjoyed the company of another German-speaking person at court).

Other projects of his include churches and the tower of the University of Coimbra.

He later adopted Portuguese citizenship.

Notes

1673 births
1752 deaths
German goldsmiths
German Baroque architects
Portuguese Baroque architects
German Roman Catholics
Portuguese Roman Catholics
Converts to Roman Catholicism from Lutheranism
Portuguese people of German descent